MBA Partners is a 2016 Chinese romantic drama film directed by Jang Tae-yoo and starring Yao Chen, Tiffany Tang, Hao Lei, Li Chen and a special appearance by Aaron Kwok. It was released in China on April 29, 2016.

Synopsis
Lu Zhenxi (Yao Chen) had a dream since her childhood, to become just like her uncle, a successful entrepreneur. But when her "Big American Dream" comes down crashing, she is left dejected, and returns to China. Now, after a fateful meeting with her idol Professor Meng (Aaron Kwok), she must find it in herself to take a second shot.

Cast
Yao Chen as Lu Zhenxi
Tiffany Tang as Gu Qiaoyin
Hao Lei as Wen Qing
Li Chen as Niu Juncheng
Wang Yibo as Zhao Shuyu
Aaron Kwok as Professor Meng Xiaojun (special appearance)
Lam Suet as Zhenxi's uncle (guest star)
Wong He as Peng Daihai (guest star)
Kent Tong as Mr. Zhou (guest star)
Gallen Lo as Zou Zhixun (guest star)
Kim Sung-joo as Lucas
Jack Kao as Zhenxi's father
Zheng Luoqian as An Qi
Yu Xiaohui as Mrs. Wang
Zhang Hui as Gang leader
Li Shuangquan as Gang member
Ni Qiaozhi as Tai Chi granddad
Zhao Lei as Wen Qing's driver
Han Jing as Bar drunken man
Yan Yuehuang as Xie Jiaqi
Man Lan as Jiaqi's mother
Zhu Bilong as Relative A
Zhou Wenfang as Relative B
Chen Wenying as Relative C
Zhu Xiaojuan as Xiao Fang
Li Yao as Cheng Dongqing
Zhu Jiali as Four-year-old middle sister
Shi Caimei as Six-year-old elder sister
Pan Jingzhi as Teenage middle sister
Xiang Yufei as Teenage elder sister
Zhang Yao as Adult middle sister
Xu Jing as Adult elder sister
Zhang Yue as Secretary Zhou
Wang Fang as Ms. Wang
Dai Chunxiao as Wen Qing's secretary
Chen Jun as A team student
Mu Haoxiang as B team student
Hao Jie as C team student
Han Li as Qiaoyin's mother
Maria Cordero as Angel
Ye Chao as Driver Lu
Chen Ying as Fat Woman
Yang Xiaoyun as High heels girl
Tian Bin as Physical education teacher
Zhu Liqun as Lu's mother
Xu Yuan as Lu Zhenxi (childhood)
Guan Feiyang as Niu Juncheng (childhood)
Shi Yulei as Simultaneous translator A
Yan Wenxin as Simultaneous translator B
Duen Fan-kit as Reporter A
Yan Yichen as Reporter B
Wang Litengzi as Wen Qing's daughter
Zach Martiross as DK CEO
Michaal J. Riosential as DK employee A
Aiden Yeary McDonald as DK employee B
Michelle Smith as Anchorwoman
Irina Bulavina as Female director
Valentina Yakovleva as Reebcca
Li Wenhan as MeiMei Wang courier
Zhou Yixuan as MeiMei Wang courier
Cho Seung-youn as MeiMei Wang courier

Reception
The film grossed  at the Chinese box office.

References

External links

2016 romantic drama films
Chinese romantic drama films
2010s business films
2010s Mandarin-language films
Films set in China
Films shot in China
Tianjin Maoyan Media films